The Atlanta Thrashers were a professional ice hockey franchise based in Atlanta, Georgia. They played in the Southeast Division of the Eastern Conference in the National Hockey League (NHL). The franchise was founded in 1999 and existed for 12 years before relocating to Winnipeg, Manitoba to become the Jets in 2011. During their existence the Thrashers drafted 107 players with the 2010 draft being their twelfth and final.

The NHL Entry Draft is held each June, allowing teams to select players who have turned 18 years old by September 15 in the year the draft is held.  The draft order is determined by the previous season's order of finish, with non-playoff teams drafting first, followed by the teams that made the playoffs, with the specific order determined by the number of points earned by each team.  The NHL holds a weighted lottery for the 14 non-playoff teams, allowing the winner to move up a maximum of four positions in the entry draft.  The team with the fewest points has the best chance of winning the lottery, with each successive team given a lower chance of moving up in the draft.

Atlanta's first draft pick was Patrik Stefan, taken first overall, in the 1999 NHL Entry Draft. He played seven seasons in the NHL, but has been called one of the biggest draft busts in league history. Two years after drafting Stefan, Atlanta again had the first overall pick and selected Ilya Kovalchuk. He became the Thrashers all-time leader in 10 statistical categories. He is the leader in goals, assists, points, shots on goal, overtime goals, power play goals, game-winning goals, and games played.

Key

Draft picks

Statistics are complete as of the 2021–22 NHL season and show each player's career regular season totals in the NHL.  Wins, losses, ties, overtime losses and goals against average apply to goaltenders and are used only for players at that position. A player listed with a dash under the games played column has not played in the NHL.

See also
 1999 NHL Expansion Draft
 List of Winnipeg Jets draft picks

References

Specific

General 

Draft history: 
Draft history: 

Player statistics: 
Player statistics: 

draft picks
 
Atlanta Thrashers